Lomographa elsinora is a species of geometrid moth in the family Geometridae. It is found in North America.

The MONA or Hodges number for Lomographa elsinora is 6669.

References

Further reading

 

Lomographa
Articles created by Qbugbot
Moths described in 1900